Grass Roots is the fourth novel in the Will Lee (character) series by Stuart Woods.  It was first published in 1989 by Simon & Schuster.  The novel takes place in Delano, Georgia, some years after the events of Deep Lie.  The story continues the story of the Lee family of Delano.  Will Lee is now working at his father's firm and running for the senate.
The novel was turned into a miniseries.

Plot
The story has three subplots about Will Lee that the reader must connect: 1) Run for election to the Georgia Senate seat vacated by his mentor due to a stroke; 2) Act as defense attorney in the race-murder trial of a White man accused of killing a Black woman; 3) Deal with gang-style killings by a White supremacist group being pursued by a former police officer. All three of these plots develop and come to a head at the same time with the election, shoot-out, and conclusion of the trial.

References

External links
Stuart Woods official site

1989 American novels
American thriller novels
Novels set in Georgia (U.S. state)
American novels adapted into television shows